David Nock (20 September 1828 – 16 June 1909) was a member of the South Australian Parliament, remembered for introducing a Bill ("Nock's Act") forcing licensed premises to close on Sundays.

History
Nock was born on 20 September 1828. He arrived in South Australia September 1844 with his parents Thomas and Maria Nock and siblings aboard Emma from Sydney.
In 1860 he settled in Kapunda, where he operated a small general store.
He was a prominent member of the Methodist Church and for many years superintendent of the Sunday-school.
He was a member of the town council and served as mayor of Kapunda for the years 1869 and 1870.
In 1875 he was elected one of the three representatives for the district of Light in the House of Assembly, his colleagues being Jenkin Coles and James White.

In 1876 he introduced a Bill to amend the Licensed Victuallers Act to prohibit serving of liquor on a Sunday. It became law but was recognised by a later parliament as a form of Sabbatarianism rather than a measure to promote temperance, and was reversed in 1878.

Family
Nock married Sarah Fanny (died 1895) in 1849; their children include:
Thomas David Nock (1850–1922) was Mayor of Kapunda 1890.
Sarah Jane Nock (1852– ) married William Taylor in 1874

William James Nock (1856–1934) married Annie in 1879

Emily Maria Nock (1867– ) married William George Clarke in 1887

References 

1829 births
1909 deaths
Members of the South Australian House of Assembly
Mayors of places in South Australia
Australian temperance activists
19th-century Australian politicians